Kuala Lumpur International Airport (KLIA)  is Malaysia's main international airport.

KLIA is the largest and busiest airport in Malaysia. In 2020, it handled 13,156,363 passengers, 505,184 tonnes of cargo and 124,529 aircraft movements. It is the world's 23rd-busiest airport by total passenger traffic.

The airport is operated by Malaysia Airports (MAHB) Sepang Sdn Bhd and is the major hub of Malaysia Airlines, MASkargo, Batik Air Malaysia, UPS Airlines and World Cargo Airlines, and the major operating base of AirAsia, AirAsia X and MYAirline.

History

Background
The ground breaking ceremony for Kuala Lumpur International Airport (KLIA) took place on 1 June 1993 when the government under Mahathir Mohamad decided that the existing Kuala Lumpur airport, then known as Subang International Airport (now Sultan Abdul Aziz Shah Airport) could not handle future demand. The construction of the airport was done mainly by a few state owned construction companies as well as Ekovest Berhad – helmed by Tan Sri Datuk Lim Kang Hoo. It was created as part of the Multimedia Super Corridor, a grand development plan for Malaysia. The chief architect who designed the new airport terminal was the Japanese architect Kisho Kurokawa.

Upon KLIA's completion, Subang Airport's Terminal 1 building was demolished. Malaysia Airports agreed to redevelop the remaining Terminal 3 to create a specialist airport for turboprop and charter planes surrounded by a residential area and a business park. The IATA airport code KUL was transferred from Subang Airport, which currently handles only turboprop aircraft, general aviation and military aircraft.

Current site

The airport's site spans  2, of former agricultural land and is one of the world's largest airport sites. An ambitious three-phase development plan anticipates KLIA to have three runways and two terminals each with two satellite terminals. Phase One involved the construction of the main terminal and one satellite terminal, giving a capacity of 25 million passengers, and two full service runways. The Phase One airport had sixty contact piers, twenty remote parking bays with eighty aircraft parking positions, four maintenance hangars and fire stations. Phase Two, designed to increase capacity to 35 million passengers per year is largely complete. Phase Three is anticipated to increase capacity to 100 million passengers per year.

Grand opening
Kuala Lumpur International Airport was officially inaugurated by the tenth Yang di-Pertuan Agong, Tuanku Ja'afar of Negeri Sembilan, on 27 June 1998 at 20:30 MST. The first domestic arrival was Malaysia Airlines flight MH1263 from Kuantan at 07:10 MST. The first international arrival was Malaysia Airlines flight MH188 from Malé at 07:30 MST. The first domestic departure was Malaysia Airlines flight MH1432 to Langkawi at 07:20 MST; the first international departure was Malaysia Airlines flight MH84 to Beijing at 09:00 MST.

Inauguration
The inauguration of the airport was marked with numerous problems. The aerobridge and bay allocation systems broke down, with queues building up throughout the airport and the baggage handling breaking down. Bags were lost, and there were waits of over five to seven hours. Most of these issues were remedied eventually, though the baggage handling system was plagued with problems until it was put up for a complete replacement tender in 2007.

The airport suffered greatly reduced traffic with the general reduction in economic activity brought about by the 1997 Asian financial crisis, SARS, bird flu epidemic (Avian flu), the financial crisis of 2007–2008, the 2009 swine flu pandemic and the COVID-19 pandemic. Johor) preferring to travel via Changi rather than at KLIA.

The first year of opening immediately saw reduction of passenger numbers as some airlines, including All Nippon Airways (resumed on 1 September 2015), British Airways (reinstated on 28 May 2015 until 28 March 2021), Lufthansa (resumed between 28 March 2004 until 28 February 2016) and Northwest Airlines, terminated their loss-making services to KLIA. KLIA's first full year of operations in 1999, in its Phase One manifestation (capacity of 25 million passengers per year), saw only 13.2 million passengers. Passenger numbers eventually increased to 21.1 million in 2004 and 47 million in 2013 — though short of the originally estimated 25 million passengers per year by 2003.

Runways
Kuala Lumpur International Airport has three parallel runways (14L/32R; 14R/32L; 15/33).

The current three runway system is capable of handling 78 landings per hour and is expected to increase to 108 landings per hour once upgrading of the Kuala Lumpur Flight Information Region is completed in 2019. These runways operate on different departure/arrival modes according to the air traffic requirements.

Operations and infrastructure

KLIA features a number of modern design features that assist in the efficient operation of the airport. It is one of the first Asia Pacific airports to become 100% Bar Coded Boarding Pass capable. Malaysia Airlines; AirAsia; MASkargo, a cargo airline; and Malaysia Airports, the Malaysian Airports operator and manager; are headquartered on the property of KLIA. Malaysia Airlines also operates its Flight Management Building at KLIA.

Terminals
The airport is part of the KLIA Aeropolis, and is made up of two main terminals; the original terminal, KLIA Main and the new terminal 2, also known as KLIA2. KLIA Main was designed by Japanese architect Kisho Kurokawa, with an emphasis of natural lighting within the airport complex. Spanning 38.4m along a grid pattern allowing for future expansions, the abstract symbolic architecture by the late Kisho Kurokawa encompasses the Islamic geometry and cutting-edge technology with the tropical rainforest in mind.

KLIA Terminal 1

Main Terminal Building

The KLIA Main Terminal Building (MTB) now also referred to as KLIA Main is located in between the two runways. There are a total of 216 check-in counters, located in 6 different islands, identified by the letters A – M (excluding I). Multi check-in services are available, designed for the use of all passengers arriving, departing or in transit. Self check in facilities are available in this airport since 2007, and KLM was the first airline to use the Common-use self-service kiosks.
The contact pier is an extension of the main terminal building with gates marked with prefix A and B for domestic departures, G and H for international flights. The gate allocation is based on operational requirements, although it has been observed that Malaysia Airlines has been operating most of its operations out from the contact pier.

Satellite Terminal A

The  satellite building accommodates international flights departing and arriving at KLIA. Passengers have to travel to the satellite building via bus.  Formerly there was an aero train but this is not in service as of March 2023. There is a wide array of duty-free shops and prestige brand boutiques in the satellite building. This includes international brands such as Burberry, Harrods, Montblanc, Salvatore Ferragamo, and Hermes. Among all international labels available within the terminal, some boutiques such as Harrods are only available in the airport. A number of restaurants and international airlines' lounges are available as well as an Airside Transit Hotel.

Within the terminal, wireless internet (Wi-Fi) is provided free of charge. The terminal also has prayer rooms, showers and massage service. Various lounge areas are provided, some including children's play areas and movie lounge, broadcasting movie and sport channels. The terminal also features a natural rainforest in the middle of the terminal, exhibiting the Malaysian rainforests.

Under Malaysia Airports Berhad retail optimisation plan, the retail space in satellite terminal A will be further optimised to increase its revenue derived from commercial space rental and a percentage of sale receipts to 50% by year 2010 which currently stands at 35%. Some notable improvements that will be seen after the refurbishments will be the Jungle Boardwalk which will be the first of its kind in the world and larger mezzanine floor to accommodate F&B outlets and viewing galleries.

The gates in Satellite Terminal A have the prefix C. The Satellite A terminal has 27 boarding gates altogether.

KL City Air Terminal
KL City Air Terminal, sometimes known as Kuala Lumpur City Air Terminal or KL CAT, located at KL Sentral, is a virtual extension of KL International Airport where city check-in services are provided. KL City Air Terminal is recognised by the International Air Transport Association (IATA) and carries the IATA designation XKL. Currently there are only three airlines providing city check-in services, they are Cathay Pacific, Malaysia Airlines and Malindo Air.

KLIA Terminal 2 (Formerly known as KLIA2)

Built at approximately RM4 billion, it is the largest purpose-built terminal optimised for low-cost carriers in response to the exponential growth of low-cost travel in the region. It was built to replace the previous Low Cost Carrier Terminal (LCCT). KLIA2 began its operations on 2 May 2014, and all flight operations at LCCT were moved to KLIA2 by 9 May 2014.

As part of its development, a third runway (Runway 15/33) and a new air traffic control tower (Tower West) were built to support its operation. klia2 has an initial capacity of 45 million passengers per year. The terminal has a built-up area of 257,845 sqm with 68 departure gates, 10 remote stands, 80 aerobridges, includes a retail space of 32,000 sqm to accommodate a total of 220 retail outlets. The main terminal building of klia2 is connected with its satellite piers with a skybridge, making it the first airport in Asia with such facility. klia2 is certified with Leadership in Energy & Environmental Design (LEED).

Check-in counters are divided into 8 rows located in 4 islands, each row identified by the letters S – Z. Boarding gates are located in 5 piers, indicated by the letters J and K for domestic flights, and L, P and Q for international flights. Piers J, K and L are connected directly to the main terminal building, while Piers P and Q are accessible via the skybridge. Piers K and L are physically the same pier and share the same gates, but with waiting lounges on different levels (Level 1A for K and Level 2 for L). For international flights, the access door from Pier K is sealed off, while for domestic flights, the access door from Pier L is sealed off instead. 

At present, inter-terminal connection is provided on the landside at Gateway@klia2 complex and there are provisions for future airside inter-terminal connection.

Gateway@klia2

Gateway@klia2 is an integrated shopping complex that is connected to the main klia2 terminal building. It has a 350,000 square feet of net lettable space spanning over four levels. The transport hub at Gateway@klia2 links klia2 to the KLIA Ekspres and KLIA Transit service, with allotted pick-up and drop-off areas for coaches, taxis, rented vehicles and private transportation.

Gateway@klia2 hosts an 8-storey car park that directly adjoins klia2. There are 6,000 covered parking lots at Blocks A and B and another 5,500 lots at car park D (KLIA2 parking rate). Shuttle buses are available to take the public from the car park D to the terminal. The first capsule transit hotel in Asia named as the Capsule by Container Hotel is also located at Gateway@klia2. Gateway@klia2 is managed by WCT Holdings Berhad.

Former Low Cost Carrier Terminal (LCCT)
The now defunct  low cost carrier terminal (LCCT) was opened at Kuala Lumpur International Airport on 23 March 2006 to cater for the growing number of users of low-cost airlines, especially the passengers of Malaysia's "no-frills" airline, AirAsia. The terminal was designed and built in accordance to the low cost carrier business model, with limited terminal amenities. As requested by the low-cost airlines, the terminal did not provide aerobridges, nor were there transfer facilities, rail connections, and the other facilities provided in a fully-fledged terminal. LCCT was located within the Air Support Zone; it ceased operations on 9 May 2014, and all low-cost carrier flights subsequently operated out of KLIA2.

Airlines and destinations

Passenger

Cargo

Statistics

Busiest international flights by frequency (Dec 2022)

Busiest domestic routes (Dec 2022)

Ground transportation

Inter-terminal transportation

The Aerotrain is an automated people mover (APM) that connects the airside of KLIA Main Terminal Building (MTB) and the Satellite Building. Each 250-person capacity train can transport 3,000 passengers per hour in each direction at up to 56 km/h (35 mph). These three-car driverless trains run on elevated rail and under the taxiways. The journey takes under two minutes. The Aerotrain operates between three and five-minute intervals between terminal. Automatic train controls manage the operation of the entire Aerotrain system, controlling the speeds, headways, stops and door openings in stations, and integrating functions that enhance the reliability and performance of the system.

External connections

Rail

There are two ERL stations at the airport: KLIA station at the Main Terminal Building and klia2 station at Gateway@klia2.

Bus 
Kuala Lumpur International Airport has bus terminals in both KLIA and KLIA2 building which serves local buses, city express and intercity express buses to various destination in Kuala Lumpur, Klang Valley and also various parts of Peninsular Malaysia, as well as shuttles between KLIA and KLIA2, terminals to Long Term Car Park and terminals to Mitsui Outlet Park. KLIA bus terminal is located on Ground Floor, Block C and KLIA 2 bus terminal is located on Level 1 of the terminal. Ticketing counters are present in the terminals.

Buses to the Kuala Lumpur city mainly goes to KL Sentral railway station and Integrated Southern Terminal bus terminal (TBS), both a prominent transport hub of Kuala Lumpur, as well as various other places like Pudu Sentral, Jalan Ipoh and Jalan Pekeliling Terminal. There are also buses to parts of other Klang Valley cities like Shah Alam (Section 17 terminal), Klang (AEON Bukit Tinggi) as well as Putra Heights LRT station. Popular providers are Aerobus, Airport Coach and Jetbus.

Intercity services are available to Penang, Ipoh, Yong Peng (central Johor), Johor Bahru, Malacca and Sitiawan (Perak). Local buses are also available to Nilai and Banting, with SmartSelangor free shuttle available to Banting, Tanjung Sepat and Salak Tinggi.

Car 
Kuala Lumpur International Airport is mainly served by tolless KLIA Expressway (Federal Route 26) which is an 11 kilometre direct road from KLIA Interchange of ELITE Expressway (E6) to both KLIA and KLIA2. The expressway also has connection to:

 KLIA Outer Ring Road (Federal 27) to KLIA mosque and Sepang International Circuit
 Labohan Dagang–Nilai Road (Federal 32) to Banting, Nilai and Salak Tinggi

The further end of the expressway leads to tolled ELITE Expressway, which connects it to the PLUS expressway networks (E1 North-South Expressway-North, E1 New Klang Valley Expressway and E2 North-South Expressway-South) which links to most of Klang Valley's major townships and further to Peninsular Malaysia's west coast states, to the extent of the border with Thailand and Singapore.

Expansion and developments

Plans

With the slight modification of the masterplan, the future Terminal 2's satellite terminal will be combined into one satellite terminal. The expansion of Terminal 2's satellite terminal will be exactly the same as Terminal 1's (the current Main Terminal) satellite terminal, where initially the satellite terminal will have four arms, and another four arms when the terminal reached its capacity. There is sufficient land and capacity to develop facilities to handle up to 97.5 million passengers a year, four runways by 2020 and two mega-terminals, each linked with satellite terminals.

A380 upgrades
The operator of Kuala Lumpur International Airport, Malaysia Airports Holding Berhad, had spent about RM135 million (approx) to upgrade facilities at the KL International Airport (KLIA) in Sepang to accommodate the Airbus A380. KLIA is the only airport in Malaysia that accommodate the landing and take off of the A380. Upgrading works started on 3 April 2006, and was completed by 28 May 2007. Works include the provision of shoulders on both sides of the two existing runways of 15 meters as well as the taxiways, building additional aerobridges at the three departure halls, namely C17, C27 and C37, and enhancing the mezzanine lounges for upper deck passengers of the aircraft at the departure halls. Emirates operates flights to Kuala Lumpur with the Airbus A380 commenced on 1 January 2012. Malaysia Airlines also started its A380 services from Kuala Lumpur to London on 1 July 2012.

References

External links

 
 
 Gateway@klia2 website

 
Airports established in 1998
1998 establishments in Malaysia
MSC Malaysia
Buildings and structures in Selangor
Transport in the Klang Valley